Cadenet is a village in southeastern France.

Cadenet may also refer to:

People
 Cadenet (troubadour) (c. 1160–c. 1235), Provençal troubadour (trobador) who lived and wrote at the court of Raymond VI of Toulouse
 Alain de Cadenet (1945–2022), television presenter and racing driver
 Amanda de Cadenet (born 1972), English photographer, author, and media personality based in Los Angeles
 Alexander de Cadenet (born 1974), also known as Bruiser, British artist

Other 
 Canton of Cadenet,  a French former administrative division in the department of Vaucluse